Panasonic Lumix DMC-LF1 is a digital camera by Panasonic Lumix. The highest-resolution pictures it records is 12.1 megapixels, through its 28 mm LEICA DC VARIO-SUMMICRON.

Property
adjustable EVF
High sensitivity MOS sensor
15 in-camera creative controls
bright F2.0-5.9
7x zoom
wirelessly links to smartphones

References

External links

DMC-LF1K on shop.panasonic.com
DMC-LF1W on shop.panasonic.com
Panasonic Lumix LF1 review
Panasonic LF1 in depth review on Inspired Eye

Bridge digital cameras
LF1